Sedmoi Kontinent is a major grocery retail chain operating 140 stores in Russia and one in Belarus. It is headquartered in Moscow.

The platform for Seventh continent was from the firm Slavyanka founded in 1992 by Aleksander Mamut, Vladimir Gruzdev and Grigory Berezkin. Seventh Continent was Founded in 1994, Sedmoi Kontinent was the first new Russian food retailer since the dissolution of the Soviet Union. In the early 2000s, the company launched a major expansion program and saw its revenue increasing from $105 million in 2000 to $1.27 billion in 2007.

History 

The company was founded in 1994 by Vladimir Gruzdev, Alexander Zanadvorov and Grigory Berezkin.

In July 2001, Sedmoi Kontinent announced its results for the year 2000: revenue grew 50%, standing at $105 million. The company, which by then had 15 stores, all located in Moscow, said that it would launch a major expansion with the aim of increasing the number of stores to 35 before the year end. The company was also looking for a strategic investor, but had been unsuccessful so far. In August 2002, the company said it was looking for a foreign partner to stay competetitive in the market.

By 2002, the company was among the 4 largest retail chains in Moscow. The company's revenue that year was $300.5 million. In 2003, its revenue grew to $445 million. According to a Mercer Human Resource Consulting study from 2002, Sedmoi Kontinent is a medium-priced store, while Ramstore was the cheapest supermarket and Kalinka Stockmann was expensive and targeted for the high-end segment.

In November 2004, Sedmoi Kontinent became the first Russian retail food company to offer stocks to the public by offering 8,415,573 ordinary shares with a face value of 0.5 rubles on the Russian Trading System (RTS) stock exchange. The company said it sold 8.42 million shares, corresponding to a 13% share in the company, at a price of 275 rubles ($9.59) per share, raising a total of $80.7 million, and said that it was planning to use the money to finance new stores. Sedmoi Kontinent was the eight Russian company to make initial public offering since the collapse of the Soviet Union.
 
In 2005, Sedmoi Kontinent expanded its business to the Kaliningrad Region by acquiring the Kaliningrad-based Altyn chain. Via the purchase, Sedmoi Kontinent gained 29,500 square meters of trading space and 12 stores in the region.

By April 2008, Sedmoi Kontinent had 133 stores, most of them in the Moscow Region. The company's revenue in 2007 was $1.27 billion with a net profit of $99.2 million.

In February 2009, the French retail company Carrefour made an offer for 74.8% stake in Sedmoi Kontinent. Carrefour estimated the market value of Sedmoi Kontinent as $1.25 billion.

In June 2009, it was reported that the company had defaulted on bonds worth 1.9 billion rubles ($61 million), but it managed to get 7 billion rubles of its debts restructured in November 2009.

The company delisted from the Moscow Exchange in 2012.

Stores 
Sedmoi Kontinent was one of the first Russian multi-format retail chains. Its two major formats are supermarkets and hypermarkets.

Sedmoi Kontinent operates the following types of stores:
Sed’moy kontinent - Pyat’ Zvezd (The Seventh Continent - Five Stars)
Sed’moy kontinent - Universam (The Seventh Continent - Universam)
Sed'moy kontinent-Ryadom s domom (The Seventh Continent - Next Door)
Sed’moy kontinent - Gastronomiya (The Seventh Continent - Gastronomy)
NASH Gypermarket (OUR Hypermarket)
Prostor.

As of July 2010, the company had 121 supermarkets and 4 hypermarkets in Moscow and the Moscow Oblast, 10 supermarkets in Kaliningrad Oblast and one hypermarket in each of the following locations: Ryazan, Chelyabinsk, Minsk (Belarus), Perm, Belgorod and Yaroslavl.

References

External links 

  

Supermarkets of Russia
Companies based in Moscow
Russian brands